The Shaluli Mountains, known in Tibetan as Powor Gang, are a large mountain range in western China between the Upper Yangtze (Jinsha) and Yalong Rivers. It is one of the core ranges of the Hengduan group of mountains. The Shaluli Mountains stretch over 500 km from Dege County, Sichuan in the north to Shangri-La County, Yunnan in the south. Other subranges in the Shaluli Mountains include the Chola Mountains to the north, the Zhaga Mountains to the east, the Yading massif in the south, and Haba Snow Mountain at the southern edge of the range.

The Shaluli Mountains were historically part of the Kham region of Tibet and are now mostly administered as part of Garze Prefecture in modern-day Sichuan Province.  Litang is the major population centre in this mountain region.

The major peaks of the range outside of the Chola Mountains include:
Ge'nyen
Yangmolong
Chenresig
Chana Dorje
Jampelyang
Xiashe
Garrapunsum
Haba Snow Mountain

References

Mountain ranges of Sichuan
Mountain ranges of China
Mountain ranges of Tibet